Vyacheslav Volodymyrovych Sharpar (born 2 June 1987 in Zelenodolsk, Dnipropetrovsk Oblast, Ukrainian SSR, Soviet Union) is a Ukrainian football defender.

Sharpar is product of Zelenodolsk youth sportive school.

Honours
Riga
 Latvian Higher League: 2019, 2020

Sheriff Tiraspol
Moldovan Super Cup: 2016

External links
 
 
 Зірки УПЛ: В’ячеслав Шарпар  at The Ukrainian Premier League

1987 births
Living people
People from Zelenodolsk
Ukrainian footballers
Ukraine under-21 international footballers
FC Nafkom Brovary players
FC Naftovyk-Ukrnafta Okhtyrka players
FC Mariupol players
FC Desna Chernihiv players
FC Volyn Lutsk players
FC Metalist Kharkiv players
Ukrainian Premier League players
FC Arsenal Kyiv players
FC Hoverla Uzhhorod players
FC Metalurh Donetsk players
FC Atyrau players
FC Vorskla Poltava players
FC Sheriff Tiraspol players
Ukrainian expatriate footballers
Kazakhstan Premier League players
Moldovan Super Liga players
Expatriate footballers in Moldova
Expatriate footballers in Kazakhstan
Ukrainian expatriate sportspeople in Moldova
Ukrainian expatriate sportspeople in Kazakhstan
Association football defenders
Latvian Higher League players
Ukrainian expatriate sportspeople in Latvia
Expatriate footballers in Latvia
Riga FC players
Sportspeople from Dnipropetrovsk Oblast